Carlos Jhon Garcés Acosta (born 1 March 1990) is an Ecuadorian professional footballer who plays as a forward for Cienciano and the Ecuador national team.

Career statistics

Club

Honors

Club

Manta
Serie B: 2008

Individual

Ascenso MX top scorer : 2015 Apertura

References

External links
FEF card 

1990 births
Living people
Association football forwards
Ecuadorian footballers
People from Manta, Ecuador
Ecuadorian expatriate footballers
Expatriate footballers in Mexico
Ecuadorian expatriate sportspeople in Mexico
Manta F.C. footballers
L.D.U. Portoviejo footballers
L.D.U. Quito footballers
S.D. Quito footballers
C.D. Cuenca footballers
Atlante F.C. footballers
Delfín S.C. footballers
Ecuadorian Serie B players
Ecuadorian Serie A players
Ascenso MX players
Ecuador international footballers
2019 Copa América players